The New Friend may refer to:

 "The New Friend" (Frasier), a television episode
 "The New Friend" (Seinfeld) or "The Boyfriend", a television episode
 New Friend, a 1927 Singaporean silent film
 "New Friend", a song by No Doubt from Everything in Time